James Mulrooney (born 1989 in Clareen, County Offaly, Ireland) is an Irish sportsperson.  He plays hurling with his local club Seir Kieran and has been a member of the Offaly senior inter-county team since 2010.

Playing career

Club

Mulrooney plays his club hurling with Seir Kieran.

Inter-county

Mulrooney has lined out in all grades for Offaly.  He started in 2007 as a member of the county's minor hurling team before subsequently joining the Offaly under-21 team.  He enjoyed little success in either grade.

Mulrooney was in his final year in the under-21 grade when he joined the Offaly senior hurling team in 2010.  He made his debut as a substitute in a National Hurling League game against Galway.  Mulrooney made his championship debut against Dublin in 2011. He started against Cork in the championship qualifiers the same year.

References

1989 births
Living people
Seir Kieran hurlers
Offaly inter-county hurlers